Dmitriy Nikolayevich Gruzdev (born 13 March 1986) is a Kazakhstani professional road bicycle racer, who currently rides for UCI WorldTeam .

Major results

2005
 3rd  Road race, Asian Road Championships
2006
 1st  Team time trial, Asian Games
2007
 2nd Time trial, National Road Championships
2008
 4th Overall Tour of Hainan
1st Prologue
 7th Grote 1-MeiPrijs
2009
 3rd Road race, National Road Championships
2010
 6th Road race, Asian Road Championships
2011
 1st  Time trial, National Road Championships
 Asian Road Championships
2nd  Time trial
5th Road race
 2nd Overall Tour of Qinghai Lake
2012
 1st  Time trial, National Road Championships
 1st  Overall Tour of Hainan
1st Stage 7
 2nd  Time trial, Asian Road Championships
 6th Time trial, UCI Road World Championships
2013
 7th Tour of Almaty
2014
 Asian Road Championships
1st  Time trial
3rd  Road race
2016
 1st  Time trial, National Road Championships
 1st Stage 2 (TTT) Vuelta a Burgos
2017
 Asian Road Championships
1st  Time trial
1st  Team time trial
2019
 Asian Road Championships
1st  Team time trial
5th Road race
 National Road Championships
2nd Road race
2nd Time trial

Grand Tour general classification results timeline

References

External links

1986 births
Living people
Kazakhstani male cyclists
Asian Games medalists in cycling
Cyclists at the 2006 Asian Games
Asian Games gold medalists for Kazakhstan
Medalists at the 2006 Asian Games
Sportspeople from Astana
Kazakhstani people of Russian descent
Olympic cyclists of Kazakhstan
Cyclists at the 2020 Summer Olympics